The Masjid-e-chowk, also known as Chowk Ke Masjid or Jama Masjid Chowk, is a mosque located in the Mahboob Chowk Clock Tower, Hyderabad, India. The mosque was constructed in 1817 by Khaja Abdullah Khan. The mosque was initially constructed with a three-arched facade. Later four arches were added by extending the structure and the two minarets in the front of rectangular hall.

See also
 Heritage Structures of Hyderabad

References

Mosques in Hyderabad, India